Filatima pagicola is a moth of the family Gelechiidae. It is found in China.

References

Moths described in 1936
Filatima